The Flemish Farm is a 1943 British war film, based on an actual wartime incident. Released during the war and used as a propaganda tool to support the Allied war effort, the film begins with the caption:
 
The following story is based on an actual incident, but for security reasons, real names have not been used. The co-operation of the Belgian Government and of the Air Ministry is gratefully acknowledged.

The score for the film was composed by Ralph Vaughan Williams in the summer of 1942, and the music was recorded by the London Symphony Orchestra conducted by Muir Mathieson. Vaughan Williams later made a suite in seven movements, entitled The Story of a Flemish Farm, from the music for the film.

Premise
The film is based on an actual event. Following the Battle of Belgium in 1940, two Belgian Air Force officers, Colonel de Woelmont and Major Hellemans carried the regimental colour of the 2e Régiment d'Aéronautique as they made their escape through France, intending to reach the United Kingdom and continue the fight in Royal Air Force. They buried the colour near the village of Vendargues near Montpellier in Southern France. In April 1941, Major Hellemans returned to France and assisted by Captain Vandermies, smuggled the colour back to Britain. On 12 February 1942, the colour was presented to No. 350 (Belgian) Squadron RAF, the first Free-Belgian fighter squadron, by Prince Bernhard.

Plot
In May 1940, as German forces sweep across France and Belgium, the remains of the Belgian Air Force are bottled up near the Flemish coast and billeted at a farm in the Flemish countryside. Ordered by their government to surrender, the commander gives orders that the regimental colours be honourably buried, rather than surrendered to the invaders. The few pilots with serviceable aeroplanes fly to England to join the Allied air forces, while those remaining are forced to surrender.

Six months later, after fighting in the Battle of Britain, Jean Duclos, now a squadron leader, is persuaded by a fellow officer to return with him to retrieve the colours. The latter is killed before he can leave, and Duclos persuades the authorities to parachute him into Belgium. He contacts his former commanding officer, now living as a civilian in Ghent and secretly operating a resistance group feeding intelligence to the Allies. Provided with a false identity and a cover story, Duclos returns to the farm, where his late colleague's wife and child still live. She is initially unwilling to reveal where the colours are buried, believing that they are not worth dying for. But she relents and the colours are retrieved.

Duclos must now travel through several hundred miles of dangerous and heavily guarded country to reach neutral Spain, from where he returns to England. On his return, the colours are paraded and formally re-presented to the Belgian Air Force.

Cast
Clive Brook - Major Lessart 
Clifford Evans - Squadron Leader Jean Duclos 
Jane Baxter  - Tresha 
Wylie Watson - Flemish farmer 
Philip Friend - Fernand Matagne 
Ronald Squire - Hardwicke 
Brefni O'Rorke - Minister 
Mary Jerrold - Mme Duclos 
Charles Compton - Ledoux
Irene Handl - Frau

Locations
One scene was filmed on Chelfham Viaduct, formerly of the Lynton and Barnstaple Railway in North Devon.

Notes

External links

1943 films
British aviation films
British war drama films
World War II films based on actual events
Western Front of World War II films
Battle of Britain films
Films set in Flanders
Lynton and Barnstaple Railway
British World War II propaganda films
Films scored by Ralph Vaughan Williams
Films directed by Jeffrey Dell
Films set in Belgium
Films set on farms
British black-and-white films
1940s war drama films
1943 drama films
1940s English-language films